František Kmoch (1 August 1848 – 30 April 1912) was a Czech composer and conductor.

Life and career
František Kmoch was born in Zásmuky near Kolín, Bohemia. His father was a tailor and a clarinetist who performed folk music. As a child, František learned to play the violin, and by the age of 10 he was already beginning to compose small pieces.

In 1868 he was studying at the Teachers College in Prague, and by 1869 he had become a teacher in Suchdol. In addition to his occupation as a teacher, he zealously performed in several ensembles, continued to develop himself as a conductor, and composed. In 1873 he was excluded from further assignment as an instructor, allegedly because he had neglected his teaching duties, preferring instead to appear with performing ensembles at balls. It has been suggested, however, that the dismissal was a political decision, since Kmoch did not conceal his sympathies for the nationalistic Sokol athletic movement.

In 1868 he became conductor of the Sokol Wind Orchestra in Kolín. During the 1873 Gymnastics Festival in Prague the Orchestra played a prominent role in the opening ceremony, and visitors who attended the event warmly received the wind orchestra's offerings, both original compositions by Kmoch and arrangements of well-known folk songs.

During this time he married Josefa Kahslova, daughter of a metalworker from Kolín; their marriage was blessed with five daughters.

The town music corps in Kolín also chose him as its conductor and he immediately created a school of music attached to it. In 1882 the school gained official state recognition. Various cities, including Prague, invited him to become conductor of their respective city wind orchestras, but Kmoch preferred to remain in Kolín. With his excellent wind orchestra he made excursions to Vienna, Budapest, and Kraków, and even a three-month journey through Russia. He died in Kolín.

Style
In reaction to the military marches of the Austro-Hungarian empire, he wrote marches that were deeply rooted in Czech tradition, folklore and folk music. In a Kmoch march, the middle section which we generally know today as the trio was almost always underlaid with texts, to be sung by musicians or choirs, or eventually the entire audience. These texts were an important expression in the development of Czech national consciousness.

Appreciation
In gratitude the town of Kolín has organized a Kmochův Kolín Festival annually since 1961, which attracts prominent wind orchestras from all of Europe. A sculpture with the image of František Kmoch stands in the Kolín town park, and a wind orchestra in the town still bears his name. A biographical film about Kmoch was produced with the title He was a Czech musician, and an operetta about him bears the title How Kmoch lived and played. In 1998, at the 150th anniversary of his birth, the Czech National Bank issued a 200-crown silver coin.

Kmoch is considered the most popular march composer of his country after Julius Fučík. His oeuvre includes about 500 works.

Orchestral works
 Andulko šafářová
 Visit to Vienna, a concert polka
 Wind music is playing
 Česká muzika
 Diese Musik, ja die gefällt
 Duo for Two Trumpets
 Festival March
 Springtime Youth
 Hoj, Mařenko!
 Jarabáček
 Jara mládí
 Kolíne, Kolíne (Kolíne, Kolíne, stojíš v pěkné rovině - Kolin, Kolin, you lie in a beautiful plain...)
 Koně vraný
 Letem světem (Flights through the world)
 My beautiful homeland
 Měsíček svítí
 Milý sen Concert waltzes
 Můj koníček
 Muziky, muziky
 Na motoru
 Na hrazdě, kvapík
 Na stříbropěnném Labi
 Nad Labem
 Plzeňský Pochod
 Po starodávnu
 Pod našima okny
 Pode mlejnem
 Pošumavské stráně
 Romance pro křídlovku
 Rozmarná
 Roztomilá
 Beautiful Prague
 Šly panenky silnicí
 Sokol Nazdar!
 Sokolský den
 Vraný koně
 Vy hvězdičky
 Vždy milá
 Za sokolským praporem
 Zastaveníčko
 Zelení hájové!
 Zlatá Praha

External links

Short biography
Stamp

1848 births
1912 deaths
19th-century classical composers
20th-century classical composers
Czech male classical composers
Czech conductors (music)
Male conductors (music)
March musicians
People from Kolín District
Czech Romantic composers
20th-century conductors (music)
20th-century Czech male musicians
19th-century Czech male musicians